Allium cassium is a species of flowering plant in the Amaryllidaceae family. It is a wild onion native to Turkey, Lebanon, Israel, and Cyprus.

References

cassium
Onions
Plants described in 1854
Taxa named by Pierre Edmond Boissier